Watayo Faqir is a legendary character from Sindh, Pakistan. Many fables based on his wisdom and philosophy that are widely spread, and are told at "Katcheri" (traditional gatherings) and are told to children in Sindhi Folklore. He used Humor, Irony and Philosophy in his fables to make it more striking. At the age of 75, he is said to have died and buried at Tando Allahyar.

Tombstone - Kutab (Sindhi: قطب) has been a center of discussion for many philosophers. No doubt his expertise in fables were praiseworthy.  Words on his tombstone in Sindhi are as:

آئون ايئن اڳ هئس جيئن اوھين اڄ آهيو

In English:

As I was yesterday, so you are today, as I am today, so you will be tomorrow.

See also
Aesop's fables
Mullah Nasruddin
Birbal

References 

He was from village Tajpur khanpur Dist Matiari Sindh

Sindhi folklore
Sindhi culture
Pakistani folklore
Sindhi people